The 2022–23 Vijay Hazare Trophy is the twenty first season of the Vijay Hazare Trophy, a List A cricket tournament that is being played in India. It was contested by 38 teams, divided into five groups, with eight teams in Group A. The tournament was announced by the BCCI on 8 August 2022.

Points table

Fixtures

Round 1

Round 2

Round 3

Round 4

Round 5

Round 6

Round 7

References

2022 in Indian cricket
Domestic cricket competitions in 2022–23